Clovis Municipal School District, also known as Clovis Municipal Schools, is a school district in Clovis, New Mexico, United States.

The district includes Clovis and Cannon Air Force Base.

History

At least two parents in Clovis were arrested in 1999 on truancy-related charges after their teenage children repeatedly missed school.

Terry Myers became the superintendent in 2010. He was formerly the superintendent of Mount Pleasant Independent School District. In 2012 the board of trustees continued the term of the superintendent.

Schools

Elementary schools 
 Arts Academy at Bella Vista
 Barry Elementary School
 Cameo Elementary School
 Highland Elementary School
 James Bickley Elementary School
 La Casita Elementary School
 By 2006 it housed a bilingual English-Spanish program; most of the bilingual English-Spanish teachers in the district were employed by this school that year. Plans called for, by 2013, for all parts of the school to be English-Spanish bilingual.
 Lockwood Elementary School
 Mesa Elementary School
 Parkview Elementary School
 Ranchvale Elementary School
 Sandia Elementary School
 Zia Elementary School

Middle schools 
Marshall Middle School
Yucca Middle School
W.D. Gattis Middle School

High schools 
Choices Alternative High School
Clovis High School
Clovis High School Freshman Academy

Other 
Lincoln Jackson Family Center
Los Niños Early Intervention Center ("Los Niños" means "the children" in Spanish)

References

External links

School districts in New Mexico
Education in Curry County, New Mexico
Clovis, New Mexico